Canva is an Australian global multi-national graphic design platform that is used to create social media graphics and presentations. The app includes readymade templates for users to use, and the platform is free and offers paid subscriptions such as Canva Pro and Canva for Enterprise for additional functionality. In 2021, Canva launched a video editing tool. Users can also pay for physical products to be printed and shipped. The company has announced it intends to compete with Google and Microsoft in the office software category, with website and whiteboard products.

In June 2020, Canva raised 60 million at a valuation of 6 billion; almost doubling its 2019 valuation. In September 2021, Canva raised US$200 million, with its value peaking that year at US$40 billion. By September 2022, the valuation of the company had leveled at US$26 billion.

History
Canva was founded in Perth, Australia, by Melanie Perkins, Cliff Obrecht, and Cameron Adams on 1 January 2013. In its first year, Canva had more than 750,000 users. In April 2014, social media and technology expert Guy Kawasaki joined the company as its chief evangelist (brand promoter). In 2015, Canva for Work was launched, focusing on marketing materials.

In 2017, the company reached profitability and had 294,000 paying customers.

Australian superannuation funds Hostplus and Aware Super are known to be investors.

During May 2019, the company raised another round of funding of 70 million from General Catalyst and Bond and its existing investors Blackbird Ventures and Felicis Ventures, valuing Canva at 2.5 billion. In October that year, Canva announced that it had raised an additional 85  million at a valuation of 3.2 billion, and launched an enterprise product.

In December 2019, Canva announced Canva for Education, a free product for schools and other educational institutions intended to facilitate collaboration between students and teachers.

In June 2020, Canva announced a partnership with FedEx Office and with Office Depot the following month. , Canva's valuation had risen to 6 billion, rising to A$40 billion by September 2021. While its value had fallen significantly, perhaps as much as 67% from its 2021 high to mid 2022, it was still known as a "darling" of the Australian tech sector along with Atlassian. Co-founders Perkins and Obrecht have already disclosed their plan to give away much of their fortune to numerous philanthropic causes.

Data breach
In May 2019, Canva experienced a data breach in which data of roughly 139 million users were hacked. The exposed data included real names of users, usernames, email addresses, geographical information, and password hashes for some users. Canva faced criticism for an initial email to customers, which buried the details below self-congratulatory marketing content. Later in January 2020 approximately 4 million user passwords were decrypted and shared online. Canva responded by resetting the passwords of every user who had not changed their password since the initial breach.

Acquisitions
In 2018, the company acquired presentations startup Zeetings for an undisclosed amount, as part of its expansion into the presentations space.

In May 2019, the company announced the acquisitions of Pixabay and Pexels, two free stock photography sites based in Germany, which enabled Canva users to access their photos for designs.

In February 2021, Canva acquired Austrian startup Kaleido.ai and the Czech-based Smartmockups.

See also
 Animaker
 Picsart

References

External links
 Official website

500 Startups companies
Australian brands
Companies based in Sydney
Design companies established in 2012
Mass media companies established in 2012
Online companies of Australia
Software companies of Australia
Technology companies established in 2012
Collaborative software
Graphics software